Thomas Christopher Greene (born 1968) is an American novelist and college president. His sixth novel, The Perfect Liar, was published by St. Martin's Press in January 2019. His fiction has been translated into thirteen languages and has found a worldwide following. He is best known for the international bestseller, The Headmaster's Wife, which both Library Journal and Publishers Weekly called "brilliant."

Early life and education
Greene was born and raised in Worcester, Massachusetts, to Richard and Dolores Greene, the sixth of seven children. He was educated in Worcester public schools and then Suffield Academy in Suffield, Connecticut. He earned his BA in English from Hobart College in Geneva, New York, where he was the Milton Haight Turk Scholar. His MFA in Writing is from the former Vermont College. His brother, David, is the current president of Colby College in Waterville, Me.

Career 
Since 1993, Tom has lived and worked in central Vermont. He is the founder and founding president emeritus of Vermont College of Fine Arts (VCFA), a graduate fine-arts college in Montpelier, Vermont, with degrees in visual art, writing, writing for children & young adults, graphic design, music composition, film, writing & publishing, and art & design education. Greene served as President from 2007 to 2020.

Prior to founding VCFA, Greene had a long career as a higher education administrator, working as a member of the leadership team at Norwich University, as an admissions and marketing professional, as the director of public affairs for two universities, as a professor of writing and literature, and as the director of a graduate program.[2] He has also worked as an oyster shucker, delivered pizza, on the line in a staple factory, and as a deputy press secretary for a presidential campaign.[3]

Works 
 Mirror Lake (Simon & Schuster, 2003)
 I'll Never Be Long Gone (HarperCollins, 2005)
 Envious Moon (HarperCollins, 2007)
 The Headmaster's Wife (Thomas Dunne Books / St. Martin's Press, 2014)
 If I Forget You (Thomas Dunne Books / St. Martin's Press, 2016)
The Perfect Liar (St. Martin's Press), 2019

References

External links
Author's website
Vermont College of Fine Arts

1968 births
Living people
Writers from Worcester, Massachusetts
21st-century American novelists
Hobart and William Smith Colleges alumni
Vermont College of Fine Arts alumni
Vermont College of Fine Arts faculty
American male novelists
21st-century American male writers
Novelists from Massachusetts
Novelists from Vermont